Juan Carlos Cubillas (born 20 October 1971) is a retired Panamanian football midfielder. He is currently the manager of Panama U-17.

Club career
Cubillas spent the majority of his career with local side Tauro. In summer 2005, he went to play alongside compatriot Ángel Luis Rodríguez for Ecuadoran second division team Santa Rita.

International career
Cubillas made his debut for Panama in a June 1996 FIFA World Cup qualification match against Belize and has earned a total of 53 caps, scoring 2 goals. He represented his country in 15 FIFA World Cup qualification matches.

His final international was a February 2005 UNCAF Nations Cup match against Guatemala.

International goals
Scores and results list Panama's goal tally first.

Managerial career
Cubillas was named manager of Tauro in April 2010, but was replaced by Rolando Palma in November 2011. He took charge of  Plaza Amador in January 2012 but was already dismissed in February 2012. In February 2014 Cubillas was appointed head coach of the Panama national under-17 football team.

References

External links

1971 births
Living people
People from Panamá District
Association football midfielders
Panamanian footballers
Panama international footballers
1997 UNCAF Nations Cup players
2001 UNCAF Nations Cup players
2003 UNCAF Nations Cup players
2005 UNCAF Nations Cup players
Tauro F.C. players
Panamanian expatriate footballers
Expatriate footballers in Ecuador
Panamanian football managers
Tauro F.C. managers